Hannover-Leinhausen is a railway station located in Hannover, Germany. The station is located on the Hanover–Minden railway, Bremen–Hanover railway. The train services are operated by Deutsche Bahn as part of the Hanover S-Bahn.

Train services
The following services currently call at the station:

Hannover S-Bahn services  Minden - Haste - Wunstorf - Hanover - Weetzen - Haste
Hannover S-Bahn services  Nienburg - Wunstorf - Hanover - Weetzen - Haste

Tram services
Hanover Stadtbahn lines 4 and 5 also serve the station.

4: Garbsen - Marienwerder Science Park - Leinhausen - Leibniz University - City Centre - Braunschweigerplatz - Karl-Wiechert-Allee - Roderbruch
5: Stöcken - Leinhausen - Leibniz University - City Centre - Braunschweigerplatz - Großer Hillen - Anderten

External links

References

Leinhausen
Hannover S-Bahn stations